The Silent Sea is the seventh novel of Clive Cussler's Oregon Files series. The hardcover edition was released March 9, 2010. Other editions were released on other dates.

Like the rest of the series, this book details the exploits of the Corporation, headquartered in The Oregon, a ship that from the outside looks as if it is ready for the scrapyard. In reality this is a ruse, as the ship is as high tech as can be.

Plot
The Corporation is hired to hunt for and recover the plutonium energy source from a NASA satellite that went down in the jungles in Argentina. 

What the members of the Corporation find leads them to Antarctica, where they try to foil a multinational plot around a converted scientific station that is actually a vast mining and oil drilling operation that has a large military base built to protect it. 

Along the way,  there is a search for a mythical Chinese Admiral's Chinese treasure ship called the "Silent Sea". That ship had to be scuttled along with its crew due to a prion disease, caught by the crew when they traded for meat from the native cannibals. The Corporation is forced to destroy the ship, since the Chinese, in cooperation with the Argentinians, are using the presence of the ship to claim the Antarctic Peninsula as Chinese territory.

Inspiration
The fifteenth century admiral is one Tsai Song. Although he is said to be inspired by the travels of the real Chinese Fleet Admiral Zheng He, it is clear from the time line, that he's based on Zheng. However unlike Zheng's south Asia and Middle Eastern voyages, Song had traveled to the Pacific coasts of the American continents and to Antarctica.

Reviews
Publishers Weekly said, "The action seesaws from subtropical jungles to the bitter cold of the Antarctic as Juan leads his band . . . into action against a host of nefarious enemies.  A cliffhanger ending will leave fans panting for more."  Marge Fletcher wrote for Book Reporter, "Of the last few Oregon Files novels I've read and reviewed . . ., The Silent Sea is the most interesting and captivating." Craig Smith wrote for Rated Reads stating, "The mystery aspect does not disappoint, although the resolution of the overshadowing political predicament is somewhat weak." Booklist states the novel is "Fast-paced and a lot of fun". AudioFile praises Scott Brick's ability as he narrates the audio version of the book.

References

2010 American novels
Novels by Clive Cussler
Novels by Jack Du Brul
The Oregon Files
G. P. Putnam's Sons books
Collaborative novels
Michael Joseph books